Paul Kraatz  (17 January 1863 – 30 June 1926) was a Finnish politician. He was a member of the Senate of Finland.

Finnish politicians
Finnish senators
Finnish people of German descent
1863 births
1926 deaths